

1945–46 

Titles
 Greek Champion

Roster
  Ioannis Lambrou
  Missas Pantazopoulos
  Stelios Arvanitis
  Jack Nikolaidis
  Giorgos Nikolaidis
  Thymios Karadimos

1946–47 

Titles
 Greek Champion

Roster
  Ioannis Lambrou
  Missas Pantazopoulos
  Stelios Arvanitis
  Jack Nikolaidis
  Giorgos Nikolaidis
  Dimitrakopoulos

1949–50 

Titles
 Greek Champion

Roster
  Faidon Matthaiou
  Ioannis Lambrou
  Missas Pantazopoulos
  Stelios Arvanitis
  Nikos Milas
  Petros Dimitropoulos
  Alekos Karalis
  Vithipoulias
  Thanasis Koukopoulos
  Kaligeris
  Fanis Theofanis
  Papatheoharis
  Giazimis
  Genimatas

1950–51 
Titles
 Greek Champion

Roster
  Ioannis Lambrou
  Nikos Milas
  Faidon Matthaiou
  Stelios Arvanitis
  Kaligeris
  Giorgos Oven
  Papatheoharis
  Fanis Theofanis
  Tripos
  Vithipoulias
  Konidis
  Filipou
  Yiaximis
  Genimatas

1953–54 
Titles
 Greek Champion

Roster
  Faidon Matthaiou
  Nikos Milas
  Stelios Arvanitis
  Alekos Karalis
  Yiaximis
  Varias
  Konidis
  Yianopoulos
  Stamatiou
  Giannis Malakates
  Kimanis
  Panos Koukopoulos
  Stelios Tavoularis
  Oven

1960–61 
Titles
 Greek Champion

Roster
  Panos Koukopoulos
  Makridis
  Liamis
  Petros Panagiotarakos
  Zanos
  Koutsoukos
  Stelios Tavoularis
  Papakonstantopoulos
  Mandilaris
  Dedes
  Katsikidis
  Nakios
  Sitzakis

1961–62 
Titles
 Greek Champion

Roster
  Liamis
  Stelios Tavoularis
  George Vassilakopoulos
  Katsikidis
  Petros Panagiotarakos
  Zanos
  Makridis
  Antoniadis
  Mandilaris
  Panagiotidis
  Papdimitriou
  Panos Koukopoulos

1966–67 

Titles
 Greek Champion

Roster
  Giorgos Kolokythas
  Petros Panagiotarakos
  Kostas Politis
  Peppas
  Michalis Kyritsis
  George Vassilakopoulos
  Chaikalis
  Kouzoupis
  Liamis
  Lekkakis
  Stefanou

1970–71 
Titles
 Greek Champion

Roster
  Apostolos Kontos
  Takis Koroneos
  Chris Kefalos
  Dimitris Kokolakis
  Charis Papazoglou
  Iordanidis
  Papantoniou
  Michalis Kyritsis

1971–72 

Titles
 Greek Champion

Roster
  Apostolos Kontos
  Zografos
  Zegleris
  Takis Koroneos
  Dimaras
  Chris Kefalos
  Michalis Kyritsis
  Dimitris Kokolakis
  Charis Papazoglou
  Iordanidis
  Papantoniou
  Petros Panagiotarakos
  Chaikalis
  Peppas
  Paraskevas

1972–73 
Titles
 Greek Champion

Roster
  Apostolos Kontos
  Singas
  Dimitris Kokolakis
  Papantoniou
  Dimaras
  Chaikalis
  Iordanidis
  Chris Kefalos
  Charis Papazoglou
  Houseas
  Takis Koroneos
  Broustas Costas
  Bogdanos
  Poulidis
  Michelis

1973–74 
Titles
 Greek Champion

Roster
  Apostolos Kontos
  Iordanidis
  Chris Kefalos
  Houseas
  Charis Papazoglou
  Dimitris Kokolakis
  Chaikalis
  Papantoniou
  Poulidis
  Koumanakos
  Bogdanos
  Dimaras

1974–75 
Titles
 Greek Champion

Roster
  Apostolos Kontos
  S. Kontos
  Chris Kefalos
  Takis Koroneos
  Charis Papazoglou
  Dimitris Kokolakis
  Papantoniou
  Memos Ioannou
  Kostas Batis
  Iordanidis
  Kabourakis
  Takis Spiliopoulos

1976–77 
Titles
 Greek Champion

Roster
  Apostolos Kontos
  Chris Kefalos
  Takis Koroneos
  Dimitris Kokolakis
  Papantoniou
  Charis Papazoglou
  S. Kontos
  Memos Ioannou
  Kostas Batis
  Kakogeorgiou
  Kabourakis
  Petrkakis

1978–79 
Titles
 Greek Cup Winner

Roster
  Apostolos Kontos
  Papantoniou
  Dimitris Kokolakis
  Takis Koroneos
  David Stergakos
  Kostas Batis
  Charis Papazoglou

1979–80 
Titles
 Greek Champion

Roster
  Apostolos Kontos
  Dimitris Kokolakis
  David Stergakos
  Kyriakos Vidas
  Papantoniou
  Memos Ioannou
  Charis Papazoglou
  Kostas Batis
  Garos
  Georganas
  Takis Koroneos
  Kalogeropoulos

1980–81 
Titles
 Greek Champion

Roster
  Apostolos Kontos
  Takis Koroneos
  David Stergakos
  Dimitris Kokolakis
  Kyriakos Vidas
  Papantoniou
  Katsinis
  Garos
  Georganas
  Memos Ioannou
  Kalogeropoulos
  Metaxas

1981–82 
Titles
 Greek Champion
 Greek Cup Winner

Roster
  Apostolos Kontos
  David Stergakos
  Dimitris Kokolakis
  Kyriakos Vidas
  Takis Koroneos
  Memos Ioannou
  Katsinis
  Papantoniou
  Kostas Batis
  Georganas
  Venieris
  Kalogeropoulos
  Garos
  Karanasos
  Roni Sakalis (practice squad)

1982–83 
Titles
 Greek Cup Winner

Roster
  Takis Koroneos
  David Stergakos
  Liveris Andritsos
  Dimitris Kokolakis
  Tom Kappos
  Memos Ioannou
  Roni Sakalis (practice squad)

1983–84 
Titles
 Greek Champion

Roster
  Takis Koroneos
  David Stergakos
  Liveris Andritsos
  Tom Kappos
  Kyriakos Vidas
  Giorgos Skropolithas
  Memos Ioannou
  Tolias
  Kalogeropoulos
  Politis
  Tsantilis
  Sotiriou

1984–85 
Roster
  David Stergakos
  Takis Koroneos
  Kyriakos Vidas
  Liveris Andritsos
  Memos Ioannou
  Argyris Papapetrou
  Giorgos Skropolithas
  Petros Vasilantonakis
  Mathiakakis
  Christoforos Karanasos

1985–86 
Titles
 Greek Cup Winner

Roster

1986–87 

Roster

1987–88 

Roster

1988–89 
Roster

1989–90 
Roster

1990–91 
Roster

1991–92 
Roster

1992–93 

Titles
 Greek Cup Winner

Roster

1993–94 

Roster

1994–95 

Roster

1995–96

Titles
 EuroLeague Champion
 Greek Cup Winner

Roster

1996–97

Titles
 FIBA Intercontinental Cup Champion

Roster

1997–98

Titles
 Greek Champion

Roster

1998–99

Titles
 Greek Champion

Roster

1999–00

Titles
 EuroLeague Champion
 Greek Champion

Roster

2000–01

Titles
 FIBA SuproLeague Finalist
 Greek Champion

Roster

2001–02

Titles
 EuroLeague Champion 2001–02

Roster

2002–03

Titles
 Greek Champion
 Greek Cup Winner

Roster

2003–04

Titles
 Greek Champion

Roster

2004–05

Titles
 Greek Champion
 Greek Cup Winner

Honors

 EuroLeague 3rd place

Roster

2005–06

Titles
 Greek Champion 2005–06
 Greek Cup Winner

Honors

 EuroLeague Quarter-finalist

Roster

2006–07

Titles
 EuroLeague Champion 2006–07
 Greek Champion 2006–07
 Greek Cup Winner

Roster

2007–08

Titles
 Greek Champion 2007–08
 Greek Cup Winner

Roster

2008–09

Titles
 EuroLeague Champion 2008–09
 Greek Champion 2008–09
 Greek Cup Winner

Roster

2009–10

Titles
 Greek Champion 2009–10

Roster

2010–11

Titles
 EuroLeague Champion 2010–11
 Greek Champion 2010–11

Roster

2011–12

Titles
 Greek Cup Winner

Roster

2012–13

Titles
 Greek Champion 2012–13
 Greek Cup Winner

Roster

2013–14

Titles
 Greek Champion 2013–14
 Greek Cup Winner

Roster

2014–15

Titles
 Greek Cup Winner 2014–15

Roster

2015–16

Titles
 Greek Cup Winner 2015–16

Roster

2016–17

Titles
 Greek Champion 2016–17
 Greek Cup Winner 2016–17

Roster

2017–18

Titles
 Greek Champion 2017–18

Roster

2018–19

Titles
 Greek Champion 2018–19
 Greek Cup Winner 2018–19

Roster

2019–20

Titles
 Greek Champion 2019–20 *
 * Crowned champion through voting between the 14 teams, after the season ended prematurely, in March 2020, due to the COVID-19 pandemic.

Roster

2020–21

Titles
 Greek Champion 2020–21
 Greek Cup Winner 2020–21

Roster

2021–22

Titles
 Greek Super Cup Winner 2021

Roster

Sources 
Panathinaikos official site - Rosters 2001-2008 (gr)
All Panathinaikos Greek Championship winner teams (gr)
All Greek cup finalists rosters (gr)
Euroleague 1996-97
Panathinaikos history & past rosters

EuroLeague team past rosters